The Barbados Police Service (BPS), previously called the Royal Barbados Police Force (RBPF), is the law enforcement agency in Barbados, as established under the Police Act, Cap. 167. Richard Boyce is currently Commissioner of the Police.

The BPS is divided into five operational divisions: the Northern Division, Southern Division, Bridgetown Division, Criminal Investigations Division and Operations Support Division. These are supported by the Administrative Services Division The organisational structure of the BPS is modelled after London's Metropolitan Police Service.

In recent years, a growing number of Barbadian police officers have been recruited to take up jobs in the Bermuda Police Service.

History 
The main Police Force of Barbados was established in 1835.
Soon after its founding the Police Force informally had mounted policemen, however in 1880 an actual mounted division was recognised and known as the Mounted Corps. (later renamed the Mounted Branch in 1933.) In 1882, the Harbour Police Force was unified with the main land division after it had been established separately in 1867. Roughly 100 years later in the 1980s the Harbour Police unit was dissolved entirely.

The prefix Royal was added to the title of the Police Force in February 1966 during a visit to Barbados by Elizabeth II. Until November 2021, Royal had remained as part of the name and identity of the force.

In 1981, the Royal Barbados Police Force became a full member of the International Criminal Police Organization (Interpol).

In 2021, the name Barbados Police Service was selected to be the new name for the Royal Barbados Police Force and replaced the old name when Barbados became a republic on November 30, 2021. The name was selected to reflect the removal of the Queen as head of state and as stated by the Minister of Legal Affairs Dale Marshall, "...the police force as it is now and as we want it to be in the future, has to be more than the notion of brute strength, a force pushing against people and pushing against objects because policing has long ago stopped being centered on brawn and force".

Organisation 
The headquarters for the BPS is in the former Barclays Bank Complex on Lower Roebuck Street, Bridgetown, Saint Michael.

The headquarters houses the Commissioner of Police; the Deputy Commissioner of Police; the offices of all assistant commissioners of police; all staff officers of the above commissioners; the secretary to the Commissioner of Police; the Research and Development Department; the Police Registry; and the Office of Compliance.

Ranks 

These insignia will be replaced, as Barbados became a republic in the Commonwealth of Nations on 30 November 2021.

Locations 
District Police Stations:
Saint Michael
District "A" station
Black Rock
Bridgetown Port
Court Prosecutors
Hastings (Saint Michael/Christ Church)
Christ Church
Oistins
Worthing
Saint George/Christ Church
District "B" station
Saint Philip/Saint John
District "C" station
Saint Thomas
District "D" station
Saint Peter
District "E" station
Saint Joseph
District "F" station
Saint James
Holetown
Saint Andrew
Belleplaine
Saint Lucy
Crab Hill

Motto: To protect, serve and reassure.

See also 

Barbados Defence Force (BDF)
International Criminal Police Organization (Interpol)
Barbados Police Band
List of countries by size of police forces

Notes

References

External links 
The Royal Barbados Police Force (RBPF)
History of Police forces in Barbados
Regional Police Training Centre (RPTC)
Crime Stoppers Barbados

Law enforcement in Barbados
Government of Barbados
Law enforcement in the Caribbean
1835 establishments in Barbados
Government agencies established in 1835
Law of Barbados